Guy Winfred Bailey (May 7, 1876 – October 22, 1940) was an American politician and educator.  He served as Secretary of State of Vermont and president of the University of Vermont.

Biography
Guy Winfred Bailey was born in Hardwick, Vermont, on May 7, 1876. He was raised and educated in Essex Junction, where his father owned and operated the Bailey Granite Monument Company.

Bailey graduated from Burlington High School in 1896, and the University of Vermont in 1900.  While at UVM, Bailey joined the Alpha Tau Omega fraternity.  He studied law at the Burlington office of Rufus E. Brown & Russell W. Taft, and was admitted to the bar in 1904.  A Republican, he served as village president of Essex Junction from 1901 to 1904, and a member of the Vermont House of Representatives in 1904 and 1906.

In 1908, Bailey was elected secretary of state.  He was reelected four times, and served from October 1908 until resigning in August 1917.  From 1912 to 1914, he served again as Essex Junction's village president.  Bailey had been a trustee of the University of Vermont since 1914, and left the secretary of state's position to become UVM's comptroller.  In August 1919, Bailey was appointed acting president of the university.  In June 1920 he became president, and he held this position until his death.

The study of eugenics flourished in Vermont during the first half of the twentieth century, and the Eugenics Survey of Vermont became the first privately funded research project at UVM.  Bailey served on the Survey's Advisory Committee, and aided the effort by negotiating for and administering the sponsors' funding.

During Bailey's presidency, the university undertook a large expansion and modernization program, including construction of several new buildings.  He also worked to reduce expenses during the Great Depression, in addition to seeking scholarships and loans for students who needed them in order to remain in school during the economic downturn.  After Bailey's death, university administrators discovered that the school had been operating with an annual budget deficit of more than $500,000, and he had used endowment funds to cover current expenses; as a result, his management of UVM's finances became the subject of negative press attention.

Death and burial
Bailey died in Boston, Massachusetts on October 22, 1940.  He was buried at Essex Junction Village Cemetery.

Family
On December 22, 1904, Bailey married Mabel G. Brigham of Essex Junction.  They were the parents of a son, Winthrop, who was born and died in 1905.

Legacy
Bailey received the honorary degree of LL.D. from the University of Vermont, Middlebury College, and Norwich University.

In the years after the Great Depression, UVM alumni sought to rehabilitate Bailey's reputation, which included the publication of a tribute book, Thank You, Guy Bailey.  When the university trustees voted to construct a new library in 1961, they named it in Bailey's honor.  This facility was expanded in 1980 and was known as the Bailey/Howe Library; David Howe was a 1914 graduate of UVM, and the longtime publisher of The Burlington Free Press.

Historical view
In February 2018 students and staff members protesting racism at the University of Vermont demanded that President Thomas Sullivan change the name of the Bailey/Howe Library because of Bailey's connection to eugenics.  The University formed a study committee, which recommended dropping Bailey's name.  The university's leadership agreed, and in October 2018, it was renamed the David W. Howe Memorial Library.

References

Sources

Internet

Newspapers

Magazines

External links

1876 births
1940 deaths
People from Essex, Vermont
University of Vermont alumni
Vermont lawyers
Republican Party members of the Vermont House of Representatives
Secretaries of State of Vermont
Presidents of the University of Vermont
Burials in Vermont